Andrew Bobola, SJ (1591 – 16 May 1657) was a Polish missionary and martyr of the Society of Jesus, known as the Apostle of Lithuania and the "hunter of souls". He was beaten and tortured to death during the Khmelnytsky Uprising. He was canonized in 1938 by Pope Pius XI.

Life
Bobola was born in 1591 into a noble family in the Sandomir Palatinate in the Province of Lesser Poland of the Crown of the Kingdom of Poland, then a constituent part of the Polish–Lithuanian Commonwealth. In 1611 he entered the Society of Jesus in Vilnius, then in the Grand Duchy of Lithuania, the other part of the Commonwealth. He subsequently professed solemn vows and was ordained in 1622, after which he served for several years as an advisor, preacher, superior of a Jesuit residence, and other jobs in various places.

From 1652 Bobola also worked as a country "missionary", in various locations of Lithuania: these included Polotsk, where he was probably stationed in 1655, and also Pinsk, (both now in Belarus). On 16 May 1657, during the Khmelnytsky Uprising, he was captured in Pinsk by the Cossacks of Bohdan Chmielnicki and subjected to a variety of tortures before being killed in the village of Janów (now Ivanava, Belarus).

Several descriptions of Bobola's death exist. One account states that he "had just offered up the holy sacrifice" when the Cossacks entered Pinsk; upon seeing them, he believed his death to be imminent and thus "fell upon his knees, raised his eyes and his hands [and] exclaimed, 'Lord, thy will be done!'". He was then captured and stripped of his habit, tied to a tree, and had a crown placed on his head, after which he was scourged, burnt with torches, and had an eye torn out; a sword was used to carve shapes resembling a tonsure and a chasuble into his head and his back respectively. The Cossacks also removed the skin from Bobola's fingers and forcibly inserted needles under his fingernails. Bobola continuously prayed for his torturers until his tongue was torn out and his head crushed, thereby killing him. A second account states that the Cossacks first tried to make Bobola renounce his religion; when he refused, he was stripped, tied to a hedge, and whipped. A crown of twigs was mockingly placed on his head and he was then dragged to a butcher's shop where, after continued refusals to renounce his faith, the skin was torn off his chest and back and holes were cut into his palms. Bobola was subjected to further tortures for two hours before having an awl driven into his heart, being strung up by his feet, and being killed with a sabre. A third account states that Bobola was seized and severely beaten by two Cossacks who then tied him to their saddles in order to take him to Janów; there, he was subjected to tortures including burning, strangulation, and flaying, before finally being killed with a sabre.

Veneration

Bobola's body was originally buried in the Jesuit church in Pinsk. It was later moved to their church in Polotsk. By the beginning of the 18th century, however, nobody knew where Bobola's body was buried. In 1701 Father Martin Godebski, S.J., the rector of the Pinsk College, reputedly had a vision of Bobola. This caused him to order a search for the body. It was reportedly found completely incorrupt, which is recognized by the Church and its supporters as evidence of holiness. In 1719 the casket was officially reopened and the body was inspected by qualified medical personnel (five physicians and pharmacists). It was reportedly still completely incorrupt: pliable and with soft flesh.

On 23 June 1922, the coffin with the relics of Andrew Bobola was opened in Polotsk and an examination was carried out. In December 1922, the coffin with the corpse of Andrew Bobola was delivered to Moscow and placed in the hall of the Popular Exhibition on Health Protection of the People's Commissariat for Health. In January 1923, he was examined by a special commission and an act was drawn up, according to which the corpse of Andrew Bobola is a naturally mummified corpse, which is in the stage of slow decomposition. No traces of gross mechanical violence that could establish the cause of death of the deceased were found on the surviving parts of the corpse. The results of the examinations were published in 1924 in the journal Revolution and Church. Later described by an American journalist as a "remarkably well-preserved mummy", to the Museum of Hygiene of People's Commissioners of Health in Moscow.  The whereabouts of the remains were not known to the Catholic authorities, and Pope Pius XI charged the Papal Famine Relief Mission in Russia, headed by American Jesuit Father Edmund A. Walsh, with the task of locating and "rescuing" them. In October 1923—as a kind of "pay" for help during famine—the remains were released to Walsh and his assistant director, Father Louis J. Gallagher, S.J.  Well-packed by the two Jesuits, they were delivered to the Holy See by Gallagher on All Saints' Day (1 November) 1923. In May 1924, the relics were installed in Rome's Church of the Gesù, the main church of the Society of Jesus.

Since 19 June 1938 the body has been venerated at a shrine in Warsaw, with an arm remaining at the original shrine in Rome (see photo at left).

Declared blessed by Pope Pius IX on 30 October 1853, Bobola was canonized by Pope Pius XI on 17 April 1938. His feast day was originally celebrated by the Jesuits on 23 May, but it is now generally celebrated on 16 May. In 2002, the Bishops' Conference of Poland declared Bobola a patron saint of Poland.

See also

 List of Catholic saints

References

External links

 Andrew Bobola – Saint of the Roman Catholic Church
 St. Andrew Bobola Polish RC Church in London

Jesuit saints
1591 births
1657 deaths
People from Sandomierz County
17th-century Polish Jesuits
Polish Roman Catholic missionaries
Jesuit martyrs
Polish Roman Catholic saints
17th-century Polish nobility
Martyred Roman Catholic priests
17th-century Christian saints
17th-century Roman Catholic martyrs
Incorrupt saints
Burials at the Church of the Gesù
Patron saints of Poland